Fort Victoria, near present-day Smoky Lake, Alberta, was established by the Hudson's Bay Company in 1864 on the North Saskatchewan River as a trading post with the local Cree First Nations. It had previously been settled in 1862 as a Methodist Missionary site, on the location of an aboriginal meeting place. It was named Victoria Settlement, after Queen Victoria.

Today, it is a historical museum known as Victoria Settlement. The nearby rural residences are Pakan, Alberta. Metis Crossing Cultural Heritage Gathering Centre is nearby.

Location and setting 

Fort Victoria (Victoria Settlement) is located on the banks of the North Saskatchewan River, downstream from Edmonton House between Edmonton and Fort Pitt, It was a stopping house on the overland route between the two, the Carlton Trail system.  The fur trading post at Victoria was minor compared to Edmonton but soon attracted a small agricultural settlement around itself much like other Hudson's Bay Company posts at this time.

History 

Established by colonists as a missionary site in 1862-63, Victoria was the home for the McDougall missionary family. This site was chosen because of its popularity as a Cree gathering and hunting area

Land in the area was used according to the customary French riverlot system, and a mixed community of First Nations, Métis, and Europeans developed.  For several miles on each side of the present-day museum the riverlot system is still in use, the official survey reflecting the fact that farms and land usage predated the Dominion Land Survey of the 1880s. (The DLS in most cases carved up large, square tracts as per Dominion Lands Act).

Fort Victoria was an example of a community that shifted from subsistence on wildlife—specifically bison—and trade in furs to agriculture (crops and livestock).

In 1864 George Flett was given the job of opening a Hudson's Bay Company trading post at Fort Victoria.
Flett was of Orkney and Cree descent. Flett and John Norris led the first brigade of Red River ox-carts from Winnipeg to Edmonton, taking three and a half months on the journey. They passed through Victoria Settlement
As clerk in charge of the post until 1866, Flett was responsible for arranging for construction of the buildings and for opening up trade with the local Indians.
Flett quickly obtained a supply of good-quality furs, which Flett and his assistants took by horse and dog train to Fort Edmonton for shipment downriver to Hudsons Bay.
The oldest building in Alberta still on its original foundations is the clerk's quarters at Fort Victoria, which dates from 1865.

Later the site of the Fort became a hub for the early settlement of East-Central Alberta.  It came to be called the Victoria Settlement and later, Pakan, after the Cree chief Pakannuk. Chief Pakan's name was sometimes given as "Peccan or Seenum".

Categories</ref> Still later, the settlement continued to serve as a Methodist mission to  Ukrainian Canadian settlers in the region.

The post was also a vital stop on the trail from Winnipeg to Edmonton.  The section of the trail currently within the eastern part of the city of Edmonton is a now a paved road called Victoria Trail in honour of the fort and of this route's historic past as an indigenous trail and trade route.

The Fort lies within the larger Victoria District, as well as the Kalyna Country ecomuseum.  It has been designated a national historic site of Canada, a provincial historic site of Alberta, as well as municipally designated by Smoky Lake County.

Victoria Park Cemetery 

The Victoria Park Cemetery was established circa 1896 by the Methodist church and is located on a hill overlooking the river. It is the second of six cemeteries established in the settlement. It contains approximately 100 recognizable graves from both Native and Settler communities, likely including victims of an 1870 smallpox epidemic.  It was restored and rededicated in 1999.

Victoria District National Historic Site of Canada 
Fort Victoria and the Victoria Park Cemetery is situated within the larger geographic space of the Victoria District, which itself is currently one of twenty-three national historic sites in Alberta; only three, including the Victoria District, are north of Edmonton. Of these sites, the Victoria District is the only rural national historic site in Alberta.

See also 

 History of Alberta
 Kalyna Country
 Fort Pitt

Affiliations 
The Museum at Fort Victoria is affiliated with: CMA,  CHIN, and Virtual Museum of Canada.

References

External links 
Alberta Culture and Community. Victoria Settlement

Victoria Settlement
Christian missions in North America
History of Methodism
Hudson's Bay Company forts
Cree
Ukrainian Canadian religion
1865 establishments in the British Empire
Residential buildings completed in 1865
Smoky Lake County
Presbyterianism in Canada
History of Presbyterianism
Rupert's Land
Cultural landscapes
Victoria Park Cemetery